Ellisville is a village in Fulton County, Illinois, United States. The population was 96 at the 2010 census.

History
Ellisville is named for its founder, Levi D. Ellis.

Geography
Ellisville is located in northwestern Fulton County at  (40.627035, -90.304994), on the west side of the Spoon River, a south-flowing tributary of the Illinois River.

Demographics

As of the 2000 United States Census, there were 87 people, 41 households, and 28 families living in the village. The racial makeup of the village was 100.00% White.

There were 41 households, out of which 14.6% had children under the age of 18 living with them, 63.4% were married couples living together, 4.9% had a female householder with no husband present, and 29.3% were non-families. 29.3% of all households were made up of individuals, and 14.6% had someone living alone who was 65 years of age or older. The average household size was 2.12 and the average family size was 2.59.

In the village, the population was spread out, with 12.6% under the age of 18, 11.5% from 18 to 24, 25.3% from 25 to 44, 37.9% from 45 to 64, and 12.6% who were 65 years of age or older. The median age was 45 years. For every 100 females, there were 89.1 males. For every 100 females age 18 and over, there were 94.9 males.

The median income for a household in the village was $35,250, and the median income for a family was $45,833. Males had a median income of $35,000 versus $23,438 for females. The per capita income for the village was $16,225. There were no families and 3.7% of the population living below the poverty line, including no under eighteens and none of those over 64.

References

Villages in Fulton County, Illinois
Villages in Illinois